Maarten (IPA: [ˈmaːrtə(n)]) is a Dutch language male given name. It is a cognate to and the standardized Dutch form of Martin, as in for example Sint Maarten (named after Martin of Tours).

People with the name 
 Geert-Maarten Mol, Dutch One Day International cricketer
 J. Maarten Troost, Dutch-American travel writer and essayist
 Maarten 't Hart, Dutch writer
 Maarten Altena, Dutch composer and contrabassist
 Maarten Arens, Dutch judoka
 Maarten Atmodikoro, retired Dutch footballer
 Maarten Baas, Dutch designer
 Maarten Biesheuvel, Dutch writer
 Maarten Boddaert, Dutch footballer
 Maarten Boudry, Flemish philosopher and skeptic
 Maarten Bouwknecht, Dutch footballer
 Maarten Brzoskowski, Dutch competitive swimmer
 Maarten de Bruijn, Dutch engineer
 Maarten de Jonge, Dutch racing cyclist
 Maarten de Niet Gerritzoon, 20th century Dutch politician
 Maarten de Wit, 19th-20th century Dutch sailor
 Maarten den Bakker, retired Dutch racing cyclist
 Maarten Dirk van Renesse van Duivenbode, 19th century Dutch merchant
 Maarten Ducrot, former Dutch racing cyclist and currently cycling reporter
 Maarten Fontein, Dutch executive
 Maarten Froger, former Dutch field hockey striker
 Maarten Gerritsz Vries, 17th century Dutch explorer and cartographer
 Maarten Hajer, Dutch political scientist and urban and regional planner
 Maarten Haverkamp, former Dutch politician
 Maarten Heijmans, Dutch actor
 Maarten Heisen, Dutch sprinter
 Maarten J. M. Christenhusz, Dutch botanist and plant photographer
 Maarten Jansen, Dutch academic and professor of Mesoamerican archaeology and history
 Maarten Kloosterman, retired Dutch rower
 Maarten Krabbé, 20th century Dutch painter
 Maarten Lafeber, Dutch golfer
 Maarten Maartens, 18-19th century Dutch writer
 Maarten Martens, Belgian footballer
 Maarten Meiners, Dutch alpine ski racer
 Maarten Nagtegaal, Dutch Socialite (son of billionaire CEO of DAF Trucks Frans Nagtegaal
 Maarten Neyens, Belgian racing cyclist
 Maarten Rudelsheim, Dutch-Flemish political activist
 Maarten Schakel Jr., Dutch politician
 Maarten Schakel, Sr., 20th century Dutch politician
 Maarten Schenck van Nydeggen, 16th century Dutch military commander
 Maarten Schmidt, Dutch astronomer
 Maarten Stekelenburg (footballer, born 1972)
 Maarten Stekelenburg, Dutch footballer
 Maarten Swings, Belgian speed skater
 Maarten Tjallingii, former Dutch racing cyclist
 Maarten Treurniet, Dutch film director
 Maarten Tromp, 17th century officer and later admiral in the Dutch navy
 Maarten van den Bergh, Dutch businessman
 Maarten van der Goes van Dirxland, 18th-19th century Dutch politician
 Maarten van der Linden, former Dutch rower
 Maarten van der Vleuten, Dutch producer, composer and recording artist
 Maarten van der Weijden, Dutch long distance and marathon swimmer
 Maarten van Dulm, 19th-20th century vice-admiral of the Royal Dutch Navy and olympic fencer
 Maarten Van Garderen, Dutch volleyball player
 Maarten van Gent, Dutch basketball coach
 Maarten van Grimbergen, former Dutch field hockey player
 Maarten van Heemskerck, 16th century Dutch painter
 Maarten Van Lieshout, Belgian footballer
 Maarten van Roozendaal, Dutch singer
 Maarten van Rossem, Dutch historian
 Maarten van Rossum, 16th century Netherlandish military officer
 Maarten van Severen, 20th century Belgian furniture designer
 Maarten Vrolijk, 20th century Dutch journalist
 Maarten Wevers, Zealandic diplomat and public servant
 Maarten Wynants, Belgian racing cyclist
 Maarten Leunen, American professional basketballer
 Maarten van den Hove, 17th century Dutch astronomer
 Maarten Houttuyn, Dutch naturalist

See also 
 Martijn (given name), another common Dutch cognate of Martin

References 

Dutch masculine given names